Mounir Soufiani (born 29 August 1981) is a football manager and former professional player who played as a defender. As of the 2021–22 season, he is the head coach of the reserve team of French club Bourges. Born in France, he is a former Morocco youth international.

References

External links
 
 
 

1981 births
Living people
Sportspeople from Bourges
Association football defenders
Moroccan footballers
Neuchâtel Xamax FCS players
FC St. Gallen players
FC Schaffhausen players
Stade Lavallois players
R.A.E.C. Mons players
FC Libourne players
AS Béziers (2007) players
Bergerac Périgord FC players
Bourges 18 players
French sportspeople of Moroccan descent
Championnat National 3 players
Championnat National 2 players
Ligue 2 players
Swiss Super League players
Belgian Pro League players
Challenger Pro League players
Championnat National players
Division d'Honneur players
French football managers
Moroccan football managers
Association football coaches
Championnat National 3 managers
French footballers
Footballers from Centre-Val de Loire